Bhimsen Das Pradhan is a member of 2nd Nepalese Constituent Assembly. He won Kathmandu–6 seat in 2013 Nepalese Constituent Assembly election from Nepali Congress. On 26 July 2017, he was appointed Defence Minister of Nepal by Prime Minister Deuba.

References

Nepali Congress politicians from Bagmati Province
Living people
Nepal MPs 2017–2022
Government ministers of Nepal
Members of the 2nd Nepalese Constituent Assembly
1953 births